Annie Pettway may refer to:

 Annie Bell Pettway (1930–2003), American artist
 Annie E. Pettway (1904–1972), American artist